The 2019–20 season was Associazione Sportiva Roma's 92nd in existence and 91st season in the top flight of Italian football. Having finished sixth the previous season, the club competed in Serie A, the Coppa Italia, and the UEFA Europa League.

Shakhtar Donetsk coach Paulo Fonseca was hired by the club on 11 June to replace interim manager Claudio Ranieri, hired following the sacking of Eusebio Di Francesco the previous season, on a permanent basis.

The season was the first since 2000-01 without Daniele de Rossi part of the first-team squad, who joined Boca Juniors, after spending 18 seasons with the club.

Players

Squad information
Last updated on 7 February 2020
Appearances and goals include all competitions

Transfers

In

Loans in

Out

Loans out

Pre-season and friendlies

Competitions

Serie A

League table

Results summary

Results by round

Matches

Coppa Italia

UEFA Europa League

Group stage

Knockout phase

Round of 32

Round of 16

Statistics

Appearances and goals

|-
! colspan=14 style="background:#B21B1C; color:#FFD700; text-align:center"| Goalkeepers

|-
! colspan=14 style="background:#B21B1C; color:#FFD700; text-align:center"| Defenders

|-
! colspan=14 style="background:#B21B1C; color:#FFD700; text-align:center"| Midfielders

|-
! colspan=14 style="background:#B21B1C; color:#FFD700; text-align:center"| Forwards

|-
! colspan=14 style="background:#B21B1C; color:#FFD700; text-align:center"| Players transferred out during the season

Goalscorers

Last updated: 6 August 2020

Clean sheets

Last updated: 6 August 2020

Disciplinary record

Last updated: 6 August 2020

References

A.S. Roma seasons
Roma
Roma